The Krispie is a toasted coconut biscuit made by Griffin's Foods of New Zealand.

Krispies are available in 250 g single packs and 500 g double packs. A chocolate-coated version is also made.

Notes 

Biscuit brands
Biscuits
New Zealand confectionery